The Serie A2 was the second level division in the Sammarinese football league system between 1986 and 1996.

Champions

References 
 San Marino – List of Champions

External links 
 Republic of San Marino Final Tables 1985–90 (en inglés)
 Republic of San Marino Final Tables 1991–2000 (en inglés)

Football leagues in San Marino
1986 establishments in San Marino
Sports leagues established in 1986
San